The 2017–18 season is Académica's second season in the LigaPro. This season they will also take part in the Taça de Portugal and Taça da Liga.

Pre-season and friendlies

Competitions

Overall record

LigaPro

League table

Results by round

Matches

Taça de Portugal

Second round

Third round

Fourth round

Fifth round

Taça da Liga

First round

Players

Appearances and goals

{| class="wikitable" style="text-align:center; text-align:center; width:95%"
! rowspan="2" style="vertical-align:center; style=" |
! rowspan="2" style="vertical-align:center; style=" |
! rowspan="2" style="vertical-align:center; style=" |
! rowspan="2" style="vertical-align:center;" |Player
! colspan="3" style="width:85px;" |Primeira Liga
! colspan="3" style="width:85px;" |Taça de Portugal
! colspan="3" style="width:85px;" |Taça da Liga
! colspan="3" style="width:85px;" |Total
|-
!
!
!
!
!
!
!
!
!
!
!
!
|-
| align="right" |5
| align="center" |DF
| align="center" |
| align="left" |Pedro Empis
|6||5||0
||0||0||0
||1||0||0
!7!!5!!0
|-
| align="right" |6
| align="center" |MF
| align="center" |
| align="left" |Ricardo Dias
|25||1||5
||4||0||0
||0||0||0
!29!!1!!5
|-
| align="right" |7
| align="center" |FW
| align="center" |
| align="left" |Marinho
|18||7||4
||2||1||2
||1||0||0
!21!!8!!6
|-
| align="right" |8
| align="center" |MF
| align="center" |
| align="left" |Hwang Mun-ki
|9||8||0
||0||2||0
||1||0||0
!10!!9!!0
|-
| align="right" |9
| align="center" |FW
| align="center" |
| align="left" |Leandro Cardoso
|0||0||0
||0||0||0
||0||0||0
!0!!0!!0
|-
| align="right" |10
| align="center" |MF
| align="center" |
| align="left" |Zé Tiago
|12||10||1
||1||0||0
||1||0||0
!14!!10!!1
|-
| align="right" |11
| align="center" |FW
| align="center" |
| align="left" |Femi Balogun
|20||2||3
||3||0||0
||0||0||0
!23!!2!!3
|-
| align="right" |13
| align="center" |DF
| align="center" |
| align="left" |João Real
|34||0||5
||3||0||0
||1||0||0
!38!!0!!5
|-
| align="right" |14
| align="center" |DF
| align="center" |
| align="left" |João Simões
|7||0||0
||0||0||0
||0||0||0
!7!!0!!0
|-
| align="right" |18
| align="center" |DF
| align="center" |
| align="left" |Nuno Esgueirão
|0||0||0
||0||0||0
||0||0||0
!0!!0!!0
|-
| align="right" |19
| align="center" |DF
| align="center" |
| align="left" |Nélson Pedroso
|30||0||3
||4||0||2
||0||0||0
!34!!0!!5
|-
| align="right" |20
| align="center" |FW
| align="center" |
| align="left" |João Traquina
|1||1||1
||0||0||0
||0||0||0
!1!!1!!1
|-
| align="right" |21
| align="center" |MF
| align="center" |
| align="left" |Guima
|22||6||1
||4||0||0
||1||0||0
!27!!6!!1
|-
| align="right" |22
| align="center" |MF
| align="center" |
| align="left" |Chiquinho
|34||0||9
||3||1||0
||0||0||0
!37!!1!!9
|-
| align="right" |23
| align="center" |DF
| align="center" |
| align="left" |Mike Moura
|27||1||0
||4||0||1
||1||0||0
!32!!1!!1
|-
| align="right" |30
| align="center" |MF
| align="center" |
| align="left" |David Teles
|0||1||0
||0||0||0
||0||1||0
!0!!2!!0
|-
| align="right" |31
| align="center" |DF
| align="center" |
| align="left" |Pedro Coronas
|0||0||0
||0||0||0
||0||0||0
!0!!0!!0
|-
| align="right" |39
| align="center" |FW
| align="center" |
| align="left" |Donald Djoussé
|20||12||10
||2||2||1
||0||1||0
!22!!15!!11
|-
| align="right" |43
| align="center" |DF
| align="center" |
| align="left" |Brendon
|9||2||0
||0||0||0
||0||0||0
!9!!2!!0
|-
| align="right" |44
| align="center" |DF
| align="center" |
| align="left" |Yuri Matias
|11||2||0
||2||1||0
||1||0||0
!14!!3!!0
|-
| align="right" |59
| align="center" |GK
| align="center" |
| align="left" |Guilherme Oliveira
|1||0||-1
||2||0||-2
||0||0||0
!2!!0!!-2
|-
| align="right" |65
| align="center" |MF
| align="center" |
| align="left" |Fernando Alexandre
|4||4||1
||0||0||0
||0||0||0
!4!!4!!1
|-
| align="right" |66
| align="center" |FW
| align="center" |
| align="left" |Diogo Ribeiro
|2||11||2
||2||0||0
||0||0||0
!4!!11!!2
|-
| align="right" |70
| align="center" |FW
| align="center" |
| align="left" |Piqueti
|0||6||0
||0||0||0
||0||0||0
!0!!6!!0
|-
| align="right" |77
| align="center" |FW
| align="center" |
| align="left" |Luisinho
|18||7||3
||1||1||0
||0||1||0
!19!!9!!3
|-
| align="right" |83
| align="center" |DF
| align="center" |
| align="left" |Zé Castro
|16||0||0
||2||0||0
||0||0||0
!19!!0!!0
|-
| align="right" |87
| align="center" |GK
| align="center" |
| align="left" |Ricardo Ribeiro
|34||0||-33
||2||0||-1
||1||0||0
!37!!0!!-34
|-
| align="right" |90
| align="center" |FW
| align="center" |
| align="left" |Tozé Marreco
|10||3||4
||0||2||0
||1||0||0
!11!!5!!4
|-
| align="right" |99
| align="center" |FW
| align="center" |
| align="left" |Alan Júnior
|6||6||0
||0||0||0
||0||0||0
!6!!6!!0
|-
! colspan="22" style="background:#eaecf0; text-align:center;"| Players transferred out during the season
|-
| align="right" |1
| align="center"|GK
| align="center"|
| align="left"|João Gomes
|0||0||0
||0||0||0
||0||0||0
!0!!0!!0
|-
| align="right" |4
| align="center" |DF
| align="center" |
| align="left" |Hugo Ribeiro
|0||0||0
||0||0||0
||0||0||0
!0!!0!!0
|-
| align="right" |24
| align="center" |FW
| align="center" |
| align="left" |Harramiz
|8||8||1
||2||2||0
||0||0||0
!10!!10!!1
|-
| align="right" |25
| align="center" |DF
| align="center" |
| align="left" |Tiago Duque
|1||1||0
||1||0||0
||0||0||0
!2!!1!!0
|-
| align="right" |27
| align="center" |MF
| align="center" |
| align="left" |Pedro Lagoa
|1||0||0
||0||0||0
||1||0||0
!2!!0!!0

Transfers

Summer

In:

Out:

Winter

In:

Out:

Coaching staff

References

2017-18
Portuguese football clubs 2017–18 season